The term Serbian nationalism may refer to:

 Serbian nationalism or Serb nationalism, a form of Ethnic nationalism that asserts that Serbs are a nation and promotes the national unity of Serbs.
 Serbian nationalism, a form of Territorial nationalism that asserts that all citizens of Serbia constitute a nation and promotes the national unity of Serbia.

See also
 Slavic nationalism (disambiguation)
 Latin nationalism (disambiguation)
 Turkic nationalism (disambiguation)